Made man is a fully initiated member of the Mafia.

Made man may refer to:

 Made Man (video game), a 2006 third-person shooter video game
 Made Man (album), a 1999 album by rapper Silkk the Shocker

See also 
 Made Men (film), a 1999 film by Louis Morneau